Slapy refers to the following places in the Czech Republic:

 Slapy (Prague-West District)
 Slapy (Tábor District)